Hollowtown is an unincorporated community in Highland County, in the U.S. state of Ohio.

History
A post office was established at Hollowtown in 1861, and remained in operation until 1905. The community derives its name from Anthony Hollow, a local merchant.

References

Unincorporated communities in Highland County, Ohio
Unincorporated communities in Ohio